Charly Bouvy (2 December 1942 – 31 March 2003) was a Belgian bobsledder. He competed in the four-man event at the 1964 Winter Olympics. He also competed in the hockey tournaments at the 1968 Summer Olympics and the 1972 Summer Olympics.

See also
 List of athletes who competed in both the Summer and Winter Olympic games

References

External links
 

1942 births
2003 deaths
Belgian male bobsledders
Belgian male field hockey players
Olympic bobsledders of Belgium
Olympic field hockey players of Belgium
Bobsledders at the 1964 Winter Olympics
Field hockey players at the 1968 Summer Olympics
Field hockey players at the 1972 Summer Olympics
People from Uccle
Sportspeople from Brussels